Balleny may refer to:
 John Balleny (d. 1857), an English captain and explorer of the Antarctic
 Balleny Islands, a series of uninhabited islands in the Antarctic Ocean
 Balleny, County Down, a townland in County Down, Northern Ireland
 Balleny, County Antrim, a townland in County Antrim, Northern Ireland